The 1985 Miami Dolphins season was the 20th season in franchise history. The club won their fourth consecutive AFC East championship and appeared in the AFC Championship Game.

Due to Dan Marino's offseason holdout, and an injury to receiver Mark Duper, the Dolphins were only 5–4 through Week 9, and in third place in the AFC East, behind the 7–2 Jets and 6–3 Patriots. Their 220 points scored through Week 9 were fifth in the league, and 85 points fewer – 9.4 per game – than in 1984 at the same point in the season.

The Dolphins righted the ship, however, and won their final seven games, including an upset of the then-undefeated Chicago Bears in a Week 13 Monday Night contest. This was the last time until 2021 that the Dolphins had won 7 games in a row. Miami won the division and defeated the AFC Central champion Cleveland Browns 24–21 in their first playoff game. Their season would end, however, with a 31–14 home loss to division rival New England in the AFC Championship Game.

Off-season
Quarterback Dan Marino, coming off a record-shattering 1984 season, held out through training camp. This, and an injury to wide receiver Mark Duper, got the Dolphins out to a slow start.

Draft

Personnel

Staff

Roster

Regular season

Schedule 

Note: Intra-division opponents are in bold text.

Week 13 

Miami finished 12–4 in 1985 and, in an epic Monday Night Football showdown on December 2, 1985, handed the previously-undefeated Chicago Bears their only defeat of the season. Several members of the 1972 Dolphins were in attendance at the game.

After rallying from a 21–3 third quarter deficit in the divisional playoffs to beat the Cleveland Browns 24–21, many people were looking forward to a rematch with Chicago in Super Bowl XX. The Cinderella New England Patriots, the Dolphins' opponents in the AFC Championship, had different plans. New England forced six turnovers on the way to a 31–14 win – the Patriots' first in Miami since 1966. The Patriots had lost 18 games in a row at the Orange Bowl. In 1969, the Boston Patriots had beaten the Dolphins at Tampa Stadium.

Standings

Final roster

Player stats

Passing

Playoffs

Schedule

AFC divisional playoff

AFC Championship Game 

In an upset, the Patriots converted 6 Dolphins turnovers into 24 points.

Awards and honors 
 Dan Marino, 1985 1st Team All-Pro and AFC Pro Bowl selection
 Mark Duper, franchise record, most receiving yards in one game, 217 yards on November 10.

References

External links 
1985 Miami Dolphins on Pro Football Reference
Miami Dolphins on jt-sw.com

Miami
AFC East championship seasons
Miami Dolphins seasons
Miami Dolphins